Andy Fetscher is a German-Romanian film director, cinematographer and screenwriter.

Life and work
Andy Fetscher was born in Munich, West Germany. He shot his first films as PR stunts for a satirical magazine, which he published with friends. After his graduation at the age of 19, he worked as a freelance photographer and journalist for a stock photo agency in Germany. From 2001 to 2007 he studied both Cinematography and Directing at the German Film Academy Baden-Württemberg in Ludwigsburg. Andy Fetscher graduated film school with his feature film Bukarest Fleisch, which was premiered at the Brussels International Fantastic Film Festival in 2007. His second film Urban Explorer, also a horror movie, was released in 2011. In most of his works, in addition to directing, he takes on multiple production roles including camerawork, editing, and sound design.

Filmography
2007: Bukarest Fleisch (TV film)
2011: Urban Explorer
2014–2016: Binny and the Ghost (TV series, 7 episodes)
2015–2017: Leipzig Homicide (TV series, 4 episodes)
2017: Tatort: Fürchte dich (TV series episode)

Awards and nominations (selection)
2011: Won four Festival Trophies in the categories Best Picture, Best Actor, Best Editing and Best Make-up for Urban Explorer at the Los Angeles Screamfest Horror Film Festival
2011: Nomination for the award Silver Raven in the category Best director for Urban Explorer at the Brussels International Fantastic Film Festival

References

External links
 
Interview with Andy Fetscher at Dread Central

1980 births
Living people
Mass media people from Munich